Laimaphelenchus is a genus of nematodes belonging to the family Aphelenchoididae.

The genus has almost cosmopolitan distribution.

Species:

Laimaphelenchus australis
Laimaphelenchus heidelbergi
Laimaphelenchus hyrcanus
Laimaphelenchus lignophilus
Laimaphelenchus moro
Laimaphelenchus pannocaudus 
Laimaphelenchus penardi 
Laimaphelenchus persicus
Laimaphelenchus pini 
Laimaphelenchus suberensis
Laimaphelenchus ulmi

References

Nematodes